Argentinatachoides balli is a species of beetle in the family Carabidae, the only species in the genus Argentinatachoides.

References

Trechinae